{{DISPLAYTITLE:Beta1 Sagittarii}}

Beta1 Sagittarii, Latinized from β1 Sagittarii, is a binary star system in the zodiac constellation of Sagittarius, next to the southern constellation border with Telescopium. The brighter primary is named Arkab Prior , the traditional name of the system. It is visible to the naked eye with a combined apparent visual magnitude of +4.01. Based upon an annual parallax shift of 10.40 mas as seen from Earth, it is located roughly 310 light-years from the Sun. At Beta¹ Sagittarii's distance, the visual magnitude is diminished by an extinction factor of 0.17 due to interstellar dust.

The pair of stars that constitute this system have an angular separation of 28.3 arc seconds, with an estimated physical separation of about 3,290 AU. The primary, Beta1 Sagittarii A, is a B-type main sequence star with a stellar classification of B9 V. It is about 95% of the way through its lifespan on the main sequence. The star has around 3.7 times the mass of the Sun and 2.7 times the Sun's radius. It is an estimated 224 million years old and is spinning with a projected rotational velocity of 85 km/s. The star is radiating 324 times the luminosity of the Sun from its photosphere at an effective temperature of 11,960 K.

The companion, Beta1 Sagittarii B, is a magnitude 7.4 A-type main sequence star with a class of A5 V. It has 1.89 times the radius of the Sun and may be spinning faster than the primary with a projected rotational velocity of 140 km/s.

Nomenclature

β¹ Sagittarii (Latinised to Beta¹ Sagittarii) is the system's Bayer designation. The designations of the two components as Beta¹ Sagittarii A and B derive from the convention used by the Washington Multiplicity Catalog (WMC) for multiple star systems, and adopted by the International Astronomical Union (IAU).

In 2016, the International Astronomical Union organized a Working Group on Star Names (WGSN) to catalog and standardize proper names for stars. The WGSN approved the name Arkab Prior for Beta¹ Sagittarii on 5 October 2016 and it is now so included in the List of IAU-approved Star Names.  For such names relating to members of multiple star systems, and where a component letter (from e.g. Washington Double Star Catalog) is not explicitly listed, the WGSN says that the name should be understood to be attributed to the brightest component by visual brightness.

References

B-type main-sequence stars
A-type main-sequence stars
Binary stars
Sagittarii, Beta1
Sagittarius (constellation)
Durchmusterung objects
181454
095241
7337